CACI may refer to:

 CACI International Inc, a multinational professional services and information technology company headquartered in Arlington, Virginia, United States.
 Central Asia Counternarcotics Initiative (CACI), an American proposed plan to tackle illegal drug trafficking in Central Asia.
 Compounding Aseptic Containment Isolator (CACI), an item used in a cleanroom to minimize airborne toxins from entering the laboratory environment.
Caci may refer to:
 Caci (fighting), a traditional martial art of the Manggarai people of Flores, Indonesia
 caci, plural of cacio, a pasta dish (see Cacio e pepe and Cacio figurato)
 Aleks Çaçi (1916–1989), Albanian writer
 Anthony Caci (born 1997), French footballer
 Jimmy Caci, (1925–2011), American crime family member